Dragana Petkovska (born 12 June 1996) is a Macedonian handball player who plays for SønderjyskE Håndbold and the Macedonia national handball team.

References
http://www.eurohandball.com/wch/women/2015/player/553719/DraganaPetkovska
http://www.zrkvardar.mk/ekipa/dragana-petkovska

1996 births
Macedonian female handball players
Sportspeople from Skopje
Living people
Mediterranean Games competitors for North Macedonia
Competitors at the 2018 Mediterranean Games